Sceloporus couchii, Couch's spiny lizard, is a species of lizard in the family Phrynosomatidae. It is endemic to Mexico.

References

Sceloporus
Endemic reptiles of Mexico
Reptiles described in 1859
Taxa named by Spencer Fullerton Baird